Mahalana is a village in Rajgarh (Rajasthan) tehsil, district Churu, Rajasthan, India.

The village has four division which are : Mahalana Utrada, Mahalana Dikhnada, Mahalana Bichla and Dhatarwala.

The distance of the village from its tehsil Sadulpur is 27 km and another nearest city is Taranager's distance is 15 km, Mahalana village has the largest panchayat of in Rajgarh (Sadulpur) panchayat simiti.

The population of the village is around 5000, with a total number of homes are around 550.

Villages in Churu district